Kenneth Howard OBE RA (26 December 1932 – 11 September 2022) was a British artist and painter. He was President of the New English Art Club from 1998 to 2003.

Life and art
Ken Howard was born in London. After attending Kilburn Grammar School, he studied at the Hornsey College of Art (1949–53) and the Royal College of Art (1955–58). In 1958 he won a British Council Scholarship to Florence. He spent his National Service in the Royal Marines (1953–55). In 1973 and 1978 he was the Official War Artist to Northern Ireland, and 1973–80 worked in various locations, including Hong Kong, Cyprus and Canada with the British Army. In 1983 he was elected an Associate of the Royal Academy (ARA). In 1998 he became President of the New English Art Club, a post he held until 2003. In 1991 he was elected a Royal Academician (RA).

Howard painted in a "traditional" manner, based on strong observation and a high degree of draughtsmanship combined with tonal precision. The depiction of light is a strong and recurrent element of his work. A notable theme is the nude model in his studio.  Another theme is a city scene, such as Venice, with emphasis placed on the reflection of light from puddles after rain. He has said:

Howard's work is in public collections including the National Army Museum, Guildhall Art Gallery, Ulster Museum and Imperial War Museum. In 1989 his work was exhibited in Tenterden jointly with Ernest Greenwood and John Stanton Ward.

Howard was appointed Officer of the Order of the British Empire (OBE) in the 2010 Birthday Honours. He died from complications of a fall on 11 September 2022, at the age of 89.

Prizes
Howard has won various prizes including:
1996 Lord Mayor’s Art Award (first prize)
1978 John Moores Exhibition in Liverpool
1979 John Laing Competition
1982 Hunting Group Awards (first prize)
1983 RWA
1985 Critics Prize at Sparkasse Karlsruhe
1986 NEAC Centenary Award
2001 NEAC Critics Prize

Associations
(with date of election)
New English Art Club (1962)
Royal Institute of Oil Painters (1966)
Royal Society of Painters in Watercolours (1979)
Royal West of England Academy (1981)
Royal Society of British Artists Honorary Member (1988)
Royal Academy Royal Academician (1991)
New English Art Club President (1998)

Books
Ken Howard by Ken Howard (2002) published by Thames & Hudson, .
A Vision of Venice in Watercolour by Ken Howard and Michael Leitch (2002) published by Harry S Abrams, Inc., .
A Personal View : Inspired by Light by Ken Howard and Sally Bulgin (1998) published by David & Charles, 
Art Class by Ken Howard (1999) published by Quadrillon, 
Light and Dark: The Autobiography of Ken Howard (2011) published by Royal Academy of Arts, 
Ken Howard's Switzerland, In the Footsteps of Turner by Ken Howard (2013) published by Royal Academy of Art,

DVDs
The Way I See It a documentary on the life and work of Professor Ken Howard OBE RA by Dave Austin & Neale Worley.  Independent production. www.nealeworley.com/kenhowarddvd

See also
New English Art Club
Royal Academy
Royal West of England Academy
William Bowyer

Footnotes

External links
Ken Howard's official website
 
My life inside 2002 article in The Guardian.

1932 births
2022 deaths
20th-century English painters
English male painters
21st-century English painters
21st-century English male artists
Alumni of the Royal College of Art
Artists commissioned by the Imperial War Museum
Members of the Royal West of England Academy
Officers of the Order of the British Empire
People educated at Kilburn Grammar School
Royal Academicians
20th-century English male artists
Artists from London